Torella del Sannio is a town and comune in the province of Campobasso (Molise, Italy).

History
The village is believed to have been founded around 800 BC and hosts a medieval castle-tower of 12th century, hence the name (meaning little tower in local dialect), and a monastery.

References

External links
 Torella's Pro Loco 
 The castle
 City of Torella del Sannio 

Cities and towns in Molise